Radical 202 or radical millet meaning "millet" is one of the 4 Kangxi radicals (214 radicals in total) composed of 12 strokes.

In the Kangxi Dictionary, there are 46 characters (out of 49,030) to be found under this radical.

 is also the 197th indexing component in the Table of Indexing Chinese Character Components predominantly adopted by Simplified Chinese dictionaries published in mainland China.

Evolution

Derived characters

Literature

External links

Unihan Database - U+9ECD

202
197